The BRM P167 is a purpose-built sports prototype race car, designed, developed and built by British Racing Motors to Group 7 racing specifications, specifically to compete in the Can-Am racing series, between 1971. It was BRM's final Can-Am race car chassis. It was powered by a naturally aspirated, Chevrolet big-block engine, developing a solid .

References

Sports prototypes
Can-Am cars